Mustapha Bundu Shong Hames (born 28 February 1997) is a Sierra Leonean professional footballer who plays as a forward for FC Andorra, on loan from Belgian club Anderlecht. He also represents the Sierra Leonean national team.

Born in Freetown, Bundu started playing youth football for the Craig Bellamy Academy before moving to the United Kingdom to play for Hartpury College. He then went on to appear for lower league sides Newquay and Hereford. In 2016, Bundu signed for Danish Superliga club AGF after a successful trial. After growing out to become an important player for the first team, he transferred to Anderlecht in 2020.

After multiple call-ups for the Sierra Leone national team, Bundu made his international debut on 4 September 2019 in a game against Liberia.

Club career

Early career
The native of Freetown, Sierra Leone, spent his youth football playing in the Craig Bellamy Academy before obtaining a student visa to study at Hartpury College to further pursue his football career.

He graduated from Hartpury College in 2016, scoring 18 goals in six outings in the English Schools' FA Cup.

Hereford
Whilst visiting a friend, he featured for Newquay once on 23 August 2015 in a 2–2 South West Peninsula League draw against Ivybridge Town, netting two goals in less than thirty minutes as a substitute. Newquay manager Sash Wheatman acclaimed him as "the best player he's had the privilege of watching at this level of football", adding "it was like bringing on Ronaldo on or Gareth Bale – he was streets ahead".

Bundu spent a season at Hereford, winning three trophies and reaching the FA Vase final in 2016. Work authorisation restrictions only allowed him to play his trade in a club no higher than step five of the English non-league pyramid, the ninth tier overall in the English football league system, which forced him to leave Hereford as they had been promoted to step four (tier eight). The goalscorer returned briefly to spectate one of their games, a 6–0 defeat of Bridgwater Town in the Southern Football League.

AGF
Bundu went on a trial with Danish Superliga club AGF in early August 2016. After a successful trial, he signed a contract with the club on 31 August 2016.

In an away defeat to Brøndby IF, he made his Superliga debut as a substitute on 23 October 2016. He came on the pitch in the 78th minute, replacing Martin Spelmann. In December 2016, Bundu extended his contract until 2021.

Bundu had his breakout season in 2019–20, scoring eight goals in the first 20 league matches of the season, and being named Superliga Player of the Month for September 2019. He finished the season with 10 goals in 30 total appearances, as he helped AGF finish in third place in the Superliga-table; the club's first top-three finish in 23 years. Bundu's season would, however, be hampered in the last month by contracting COVID-19 which kept him out for the last few games of the season.

Anderlecht
On 7 August 2020, Bundu joined Belgian club Anderlecht for an undisclosed fee, believed to be between DKK 25–30 million – making him the most expensive sale in the history of AGF. He signed a four-year contract with Anderlecht.

Playing only nine games for Anderlecht, Bundu decided to go out on loan and returned to Denmark, signing a loan deal with Copenhagen for the rest of the season with an option to buy. On 1 September 2021, Bundu returned to AGF on loan for the rest of the season.

On 1 September 2022, Bundu joined FC Andorra of the Spanish Segunda División on a one-year loan deal.

International career
Bundu received his first international call-up in August 2018, being a member of a preliminary squad. However, he did not make the final 23-man squad. He made his debut in a 2022 FIFA World Cup qualification match against Liberia on 4 September 2019, which ended as their 3–1 defeat.

Career statistics

Club

Honours
Individual
Superliga Player of the Month: September 2019

References

1997 births
Living people
Association football forwards
Sierra Leonean footballers
Sierra Leone international footballers
Sierra Leonean expatriate footballers
Sportspeople from Freetown
Alumni of Hartpury College
Hereford F.C. players
Newquay A.F.C. players
Aarhus Gymnastikforening players
R.S.C. Anderlecht players
F.C. Copenhagen players
FC Andorra players
Danish Superliga players
Belgian Pro League players
Expatriate footballers in England
Expatriate men's footballers in Denmark
Expatriate footballers in Belgium
Expatriate footballers in Andorra
Sierra Leonean expatriate sportspeople in the United Kingdom
Sierra Leonean expatriate sportspeople in Denmark
Sierra Leonean expatriate sportspeople in Belgium
2021 Africa Cup of Nations players